The  is a kei car produced by Mitsubishi Motors mainly for the Japanese domestic market from 1962 to 2011. It was first built by Shin Mitsubishi Heavy-Industries, one of Mitsubishi Heavy Industries' three regional automotive companies until they were merged in 1964, and as such predates MMC itself. In Japan, it was sold at a specific retail chain called Galant Shop. In 2007 and 2011, the car was replaced with the Mitsubishi eK and the Mitsubishi i.



First generation

Mitsubishi 360

The precursor of the Minica was the Mitsubishi 360, a series of light trucks introduced in April 1961. Designed for the lowest kei car vehicle tax classification, it was powered by an air-cooled 359 cc,  engine, providing a lowly  top speed but with a fully syncromeshed four-speed transmission. After the successful 1962 introduction of the passenger car version, called Minica, the 360 van and pickup continued alongside the Minica, sharing its development. The Mitsubishi 360/Minica competed with the established Subaru 360, Daihatsu Fellow Max, and the Suzuki Fronte in the late sixties. The somewhat unexpected success of the 360/Minica led Mitsubishi to end production of three-wheeled vehicles.

Originally available as a panel van or light van (really a Station Wagon, but registered as a commercial vehicle for tax purposes), with a pickup version added in October, the Mitsubishi 360 was rather quaintly styled. Suicide doors and a swage line which continued across the hood were often accented by whitewall tires and lace curtains (both standard on the Light Van DeLuxe, introduced in April 1962) to complete the picture. The 360 and Minica were given a thorough facelift in November 1964, with an entirely new front clip with a pressed metal chrome grill.

The four-seat version of the light van (LT21-4) could carry , while the strict two-seater (LT20) could take a full . The Pickup was rated for carrying .

In August 1966, the Mitsubishi Minicab cab-over pickup truck was launched to complement the Mitsubishi 360 light truck. Powered by the same air-cooled two-stroke 359 cc engine as the Minica, it came with cargo gates on three sides to simplify loading and unloading. In December, the 360 received a less ornate grille. In September 1968 a Super Deluxe version of the light van was added, featuring a new plastic grille and more modern interior. At the same time, the pickup dropped the "360" model name and was from now on sold as the "Minica Pick" (ミニカピック, Minika Pikku). By 1969, the new Minica Van had superseded the LT23 and it was no longer produced, although the LT25 pickup continued to be built until September 1972. It also has the same blacked-out plastic grille as fitted to the Super Deluxe and late first-generation Minicas.

Minica Sedan

The first Minica (LA20) was first introduced in October 1962 as a two-door sedan based on the Mitsubishi 360 light truck, sharing its front-mounted ME21 359 cc twin-cylinder air-cooled engine driving the rear wheels, transverse leaf springs in front and beam axle/leaf springs at the rear. Initially featuring tailfins and a scalloped rear windshield, in November 1964 the Minica (and 360) received a facelift and the improved ME24 engine (LA21).

In December 1966, along with a slightly different grille and new badging, a basic "Standard" Minica sedan was added, while the regular version was promoted to "Deluxe". Prices were ¥340,000 and ¥368,000 respectively.

In May 1967, the Minica was given another minor update, with a modified dashboard and a padded center to steering wheel. The engine was also upgraded, with the new reed valve ME24D providing a useful 21 PS. In September of the following year, a Super Deluxe grade was added, using the new  water-cooled 2G10 engine developed for the next-generation Minica. This (the LA23) also featured a full vinyl interior and a new plastic grille (as on the Mitsubishi 360 van pictured above). With the July 1969 introduction of the second-generation Minica, the LA series was discontinued.

Second generation

The second-generation Minica 70 was introduced in July 1969 with coil springs front and rear, a five-link rigid rear axle, and a three-door sedan body. The new styling featured rear hatch, a Kei class first. Two 359 cc 2G10 water-cooled two-stroke powerplants were optionally available (A101), either the Red  engine (Super Deluxe, Sporty Deluxe) or the Gold engine fitted with twin SU carburetors developing . The Gold engine, introduced in December 1969, was fitted as standard to the SS and GSS sport models introduced at the same time. The better equipped Hi-Deluxe version also appeared in December 1969.

A two-door wagon body was also added in December 1969 and was to remain in production until its eventual replacement by the Minica Econo in 1981. The GSS version gained integrated foglights and four round headlight, while the SS was discontinued at the same time. A luxurious GL version was also introduced for 1971, featuring high-back bucket seats in front.

In February 1971 a very minor facelift meant the car was now called Minica 71. Revised styling featured wider taillights and trim changes, and the water-cooled 2G10 engine was available in the lower priced Family Deluxe.

The Minica Skipper (A101C) was introduced in May 1971 as a two-door coupé with liftable rear window, and a choice of Red or Gold 2G10 engines. The Skipper was available either as the S/L, L/L or GT. This also meant that the GSS sedan was gradually becoming obsolete, as the focus of the sportier Minicas shifted to the coupé versions. Styling wise, the Skipper represented a miniature version of the seminal hardtop Mitsubishi Galant GTO. To allow for a combination of fastback styling with rearward visibility, the rearmost panel featured a small window. The top rear window opened for access to the luggage area, which featured a folding rear seat. Besides chassis and internals, the Skipper shared the front clip and lower door panels with the sedan.

By September 1971, with the introduction of the Minica 72, the sedan versions were no longer available with the powerful Gold engine. Changes were limited to a new honeycomb grille, taillights (incorporating amber turnsignals) and a new dash similar to that of the Skipper. The Sporty Deluxe version was also discontinued.

In October 1972 the 2nd-generation Minica received its last facelift, becoming the Minica 73 as a low-cost alternative to the new F4. Marketed either as a Standard or a Deluxe, only the de-tuned 31 PS (2G10-5) Red engine also used in the Van versions was now available, placing the "73" firmly at the bottom of the Minica lineup, and air-cooled engines were nolonger available. One year later, a Van Custom was added, with four headlights and more extensive equipment. In late 1974 or early 1975 the Van was updated to accept new larger license plates that were now required. The Van continued with the two-stroke 2G10-5 engine until being replaced by the bigger-engined Minica 5 Van (A104V) in March 1976.

Also in October 1972 the renamed Skipper IV (A102) received the new four-stroke 2G21 engine from the Minica F4, with either 32 or 36 PS. A new F/L replaced the S/L in the lineup. Along with some safety improvements in October 1973 both engines were replaced by the  "Vulcan S" engine, as the Skipper IV lineup was further narrowed. The coupé continued in production until July (or perhaps December) 1974, and was more restricted by emissions regulations. Mitsubishi revived the "Skipper" nameplate in 1996 on a special, "town" version of the Pajero Mini.

The Van lives on
The Minica Van, based on the 1969 Minica 70, was subsequently replaced by the Minica Econo in 1981. Starting with the air-cooled A100V, it was replaced by the water-cooled A101V in late 1972. There was no A102 nor A103 van, as the A101V remained available only with the air-cooled "Red" two-stroke engine until the introduction of the Minica 5 Van (A104V) in March 1976. The 55 Van was available in a few different equipment levels, from the Standard at the bottom to the Super Deluxe on top.

Third generation

The third-generation Minica was introduced as the Minica F4 (A103A) in October 1972 with a 359 cc OHC engine in the same layout, but featuring a liftable clam-shell rear window as on the coupé. The Skipper continued in production, as of October 1973 with the new engine (becoming the Minica Skipper IV). The new four-stroke Vulcan 2G21 MCA engine (Mitsubishi Clean Air) was much cleaner than, but not as smooth running as its two-stroke predecessors. The six single-carb-engined versions provided  while the twin-carb version listed for the GS and GSL models offered . The Van range continued to use the previous body.

In late 1973, facing shrinking Kei-car sales, Mitsubishi narrowed the Minica F4 range down to four equipment levels (Hi-Standard, Deluxe, GL and SL), with the cheaper versions featuring a new grille. The sporty versions were discontinued, as the twin-carb engine fell foul of new emissions regulations. The modified Vulcan S engine came equipped with a balance shaft (later baptised "Silent Shaft") and was cleaner yet, hence the "MCA-II" tag. Power, however, was down to 30 PS. In December 1974, the lineup was again revamped, with the GL and SL becoming the Super Deluxe and Custom. Mitsubishi also lightly redesigned the Minica to accept the new, bigger license plates now required for Kei cars.

On 12 April 1976 (March for the Minica 5 Van), corresponding to revised kei car regulations of January 1976 (length up to 3.2 m, width to 1.4 m and engine size to 550 cc) both the sedan and the van received a new long-stroke 471 cc engine, a small increase in length (entirely due to new, larger bumpers), and a new name, the Minica 5. The Minica 5 was the first kei passenger car to meet the new regulations. Both models were also lightly facelifted, featuring new grilles, while equipment levels remained the same. While power output of the new Vulcan 2G22 did not change for the sedan (A104A), the van (A104V) received a lower powered  version thereof. The Minica 5 was a mere interim model, anticipating the more thoroughly revised Minica Ami 55 which was soon to arrive.

Fourth generation

In June 1977 the car and engine grew once again, creating the Minica Ami 55. The updated 546 cc Vulcan 2G23 engine provided  for the A105A. Its sibling, the Minica 55 Van (A105V) was updated in March 1977 and was almost impossible to distinguish from the previous Minica 5 Van, aside from badging and a slightly less plasticky front end. The bigger engine provided some useful additional torque, but the sporting Minicas of the early seventies were now a memory. The traditional (and unusual amongst Kei cars) Panhard layout remained.

September 1978 brought another engine upgrade: The new "Vulcan II" G23B featured the lean burn MCA-Jet emissions control system with a hemispherical head, aluminium rocker arms and three valves per cylinder, but power outputs remained static. The model code became A106, with A106V used for the van which continued to use the bodywork of the second generation.

In September 1981 the car received another redesign. An entire new rear end meant a slightly longer wheelbase (up to 2,050 mm) and a somewhat longer and taller body. The somewhat boxy rear end, still with a clamshell rear window, looked a bit incongruous paired with the original Minica F4 front wings and doors. The new Minica was renamed the Minica Ami L (A107A), but bigger news was that the Minica 55 Van, based on the 1969 A100V, was finally retired. The new A107V Minica Econo ("Econo" hinting at its primary use as a private economy car rather than as a commercial vehicle) looked very similar to the Ami L but featured a proper rear hatch and folding rear seat, allowing it to be registered as a light commercial vehicle like its competitors the Daihatsu Mira, Suzuki Alto and Subaru Rex.

A two-speed, semi-automatic gearbox was also available on all models, while the standard four-speed manual received lower gearing for the Econo model. The engine was more quiet than before, featuring a milder cam profile. Power output of the G23B remained the same, although the Econo was stuck with a  version of the old 2G23 engine. In December 1981 a strict two-seater version of the Econo was added. One year later, the Minica was sold with the new "MMC" logo rather than the old "three diamonds". In March 1983 the Minica Ami L Turbo became the first kei car to be offered with a turbocharger, offering  and glitzy graphics. This proved short-lived, as by January 1984 production of the A107 Minicas had ended, with Mitsubishi preparing for the release of an all new, front-wheel drive Minica.

Fifth generation

The fifth-generation Minica was introduced in February 1984 as a front engined, front wheel drive vehicle for the first time. It offered three- and five-door configurations, increased size and a torsion beam/coil spring rear suspension. With its "tall-boy" design it was much more spacious inside. It retained the G23B engine, but modernized with a timing belt rather than the old noisy timing chain. The Minica sedan had , the sparsely trimmed Econo commercial version , and the Turbo gained an intercooler and now offered . Air conditioning finally became an option. Reflecting the design improvements, Mitsubishi advertised the car as a worthy competitor for the considerably larger cars of the one-litre class. A considerable improvement on the old model, sales of the passenger model tripled year-on-year in its first month on the market. Sales of the Econo doubled.

In September 1985 a four-wheel drive model with a live rear axle was introduced. In January 1988, as the bubble economy and the kei-class horsepower war were both heating up, an aero-kit version of the Turbo was introduced to compete with Suzuki's Alto Works and Daihatsu's Mira Turbo TR-XX. Called the Turbo ZEO it was equipped with the same  carburetted engine as the regular Turbo model; sales were low. There was also a low-priced, well-equipped version of the Minica Econo called the Tico, as well as a new top-of-the-line five-door sedan called the Minica Exceed.

This generation was the first to reach export markets, usually labelled Mitsubishi Towny, originally with a two-cylinder 783 cc engine and a four-speed manual transmission. Beginning in March 1985, the Towny was also locally manufactured by CMC in Taiwan, only as a five-door.

Sixth generation

In January 1989 the sixth-generation Minica (H21/H26 for front- and four-wheel-drive models respectively) was officially introduced, although the engine, wheelbase, and suspension remained unchanged. In addition to the three-door vans (hatchbacks presumably intended for commercial use) and five-door "sedans" (hatchbacks for private use), a variant with a single door on the right side, two doors on the passenger side, and a liftgate was introduced, named the Minica Lettuce. This was originally a van with a foldable rear seat and flat loading floor, to meet special tax breaks available. In May 1989 the tax benefits were lowered and the Lettuce became classified as a sedan. A three-door passenger car version was introduced at the same time. The asymmetric Minica Lettuce was developed together with the Seiyu supermarket chain, which also sold the car directly. It was meant specifically to simplify the loading of children and shopping.

The pace of development in the Japanese automobile industry was relentless in the 1980s, leaving the fifth generation Minica looking rather outmoded towards the decade's end. Sales of the fifth generation had dropped to under 27,000 cars in 1988, while almost 77,000 Minicas were sold in 1989 (nearly all being of the new generation).

An advanced new turbocharged engine with double overhead cams and the world's first mass-produced five-valve-per-cylinder engine was introduced for the Dangan ZZ model, producing . The Dangan was originally a commercial vehicle, but became a passenger car in August 1989. It was later made available in naturally aspirated form as well, as the Dangan Si and Dangan Ri. In May 1991 an automatic option was added to the Dangan ZZ.

The van models gradually lost importance as their tax advantages were whittled away, with buyers increasingly going for the passenger models. In August 1989, however, a new commercial use model appeared in the form of the Minica Walk-Through Van.

The Kei car standards were altered for 1990, allowing for a  increase in length and an increase in displacement to 660 cc. The wheelbase remained unchanged, while a black plastic element was added behind the rear windows to fill the extra space. Chassis codes changed to H22 and H27. A tall three-door MPV model with optional four-wheel drive, the Minica Toppo, was also introduced in February 1990 - the Toppo, being developed before the new regulations were finalized, did not take full advantage of them and ended up  shorter than other kei cars. The Dangan Turbo only received its increase in displacement and increase in length in August 1990, six months after the rest of the range had been updated.
 
In January 1992 the range received a light facelift, along with some new models. New were the Piace and Milano sedans, celebrating the thirtieth anniversary of the Minica, and the Dangan ZZ-Limited which has standard ABS brakes. In January 1993, shortly before the line was replaced, the Milano Limited and Milano four-wheel-drive were added.

Export versions were still usually carrying the "Towny" label and featured an 800 cc  engine.

Seventh generation

In September 1993, the seventh-generation three- and five-door Minica and Minica Toppo were introduced, with longer wheelbase. The five-valve-per-cylinder three-cylinder engines were replaced with a pair of 659 cc four-cylinder engines; one normally aspirated with single overhead cam and four valves per cylinder, and one turbocharged with double overhead cam and five valves per cylinder. The Toppo continued to use the rear bodywork of the original Minica Toppo, combined with the new front-end design. A version of the Toppo with two doors on the passenger side, similar to the "Lettuce", was made available, along with a limited edition RV version.

In January 1997, versions of the Minica and Toppo with retro-styled front ends were introduced as the "Town Bee" model.

Eighth generation

The enlarged eighth-generation Minica was introduced in October 1998 to take advantage of the new regulations, as a pair of three-door and five-door sedans with torsion beam rear suspension and optional four-wheel drive, with the only available engine the 657 cc three-cylinder single overhead cam unit, now equipped with four valves per cylinder. This version is at the maximum exterior dimensions and engine displacement limits as defined in Japanese government regulations for cars classified as kei cars. A five-door MPV built on this platform but with a four-cylinder double overhead cam five-valve-per-cylinder turbocharged engine, known as the "Mitsubishi Toppo BJ" was also introduced. Front-wheel-drive models carry the H42 chassis code, four-wheel-drives are H47. This is followed by an "A" for passenger models and a "V" for commercials.

In January 1999, the retrostyled Town Bee version of this generation of Minica and the "Mitsubishi Toppo BJ Wide" were introduced. In October 1999, a 659 cc four-cylinder single overhead cam four-valve-per-cylinder turbocharged engine was introduced, and in December 1999, a limited edition of 50 "Mitsubishi Pistachios" with a 1094 cc double overhead cam four-valve-per-cylinder direct-injection engine was made available only to organizations working to protect the environment. In October 2001, a five-door wagon version of the Minica was introduced as the Mitsubishi eK Wagon, and now serves as Mitsubishi's primary product in the "kei" class. Passenger versions were discontinued in 2007, while the models intended for commercial use continued to be built until 2011.

The Mitsubishi eK is a kei-car which is the successor of the Minica.

Legacy
The Filipino tongue twister Minekaniko ng mekaniko ni Monico ang makina ng Minica ni Monica (lit. "Monico's mechanic fixed the engine of Monica's Minica") refers to the Minica, which gained popularity in the Philippines during the Marcos dictatorship.

Notes

References
 GAZOO.com Mitsubishi Minica（first generation）
 GAZOO.com Mitsubishi Minica（second generation）
 GAZOO.com Mitsubishi Minica（third generation）
 GAZOO.com Mitsubishi Minica（fourth generation）
 GAZOO.com Mitsubishi Minica（fifth generation）
 GAZOO.com Mitsubishi Minica（sixth generation）
 GAZOO.com Mitsubishi Minica（seventh generation）
 GAZOO.com Mitsubishi Minica（eighth generation）
 
 
 
 
 
 
 
  This entry incorporates information from the equivalent entry in the Japanese Wikipedia at 9 January 2010.
  This entry incorporates information from the Mitsubishi 360 entry in the Japanese Wikipedia at 9 January 2010.

External links

Mitsubishi Minica
History of Mitsubishi Kei Jidosha

Minica
1960s cars
1970s cars
1980s cars
1990s cars
2000s cars
All-wheel-drive vehicles
Front-wheel-drive vehicles
Hatchbacks
Kei cars
Rear-wheel-drive vehicles
Sedans
Station wagons
Cars introduced in 1962